Wirdnam Glacier is a glacier which drains the west slopes of the Royal Society Range between Mounts Moxley and Lisicky and flows west into Skelton Glacier. It was mapped by the United States Geological Survey from ground surveys and air photos, and named by the Advisory Committee on Antarctic Names for Squadron Leader K.A.C. Wirdnam, a RAF pilot stationed at McMurdo Station in 1960 as an observer, who also flew missions for U.S. Navy Squadron VX-6.

Glaciers of Scott Coast